Juan de la Cruz Alberto Cano Cortezano (born 24 November 1961) is a Mexican politician from the National Action Party. From 2000 to 2003 he served as Deputy of the LVIII Legislature of the Mexican Congress representing Tlaxcala.

References

1961 births
Living people
Politicians from Tlaxcala
National Action Party (Mexico) politicians
21st-century Mexican politicians
Mexican architects
Meritorious Autonomous University of Puebla alumni
Deputies of the LVIII Legislature of Mexico
Members of the Chamber of Deputies (Mexico) for Tlaxcala